The Rue de l'Université is a street located in the 7th arrondissement of Paris, France.

Location 
The 2,785 m long street (the tenth longest in the French capital, see ) of variable width, between 10.5 m and 15 m, is flat and parallel to the Seine from which it is only a few hundred metres away.

Origin of the name 

In the 12th century, the  acquired a territory located along the Seine, west of the Abbey of Saint-Germain-des-Prés to which it previously belonged. This territory was called "" (first mentioned in 960): either because students (formerly called "clerics") came to relax during their rest periods, or because the "watch" or review of the subjects of the king of the Basoche took place there every year (this association was only recognized in 1303).

Le Pré-aux-Clercs was also the scene of many duels.

In 1639, the University sold the Pré-aux-Clercs and it was subdivided into a new district of Paris whose main street took the name "rue de l'Université". Later, with the successive extensions of the city, this street was extended to the Champ-de-Mars, crossing the Esplanade des Invalides. The street ran along an arm of the Seine until the connection of the former île des Cygnes at the end of the 18th century.

History 
Until 1838, the rue de l'Université was composed of two distinct parts: 
 the first, between the rue des Saints-Pères and rue d'Iéna, bore the name "rue de l'Université";

A prefectoral decree of 31 August 1838 prescribes the reunion of these two parties under the same name of "rue de l'Université".

Commemorative plaques

References

Bibliography 
 Jacques Hillairet, Dictionnaire historique des rues de Paris.
 Félix et Louis Lazare, Dictionnaire administratif et historique des rues de Paris et de ses monuments.
 Jean de La Tynna, Dictionnaire topographique, étymologique et historique des rues de Paris.

Streets in the 7th arrondissement of Paris